Marina di Casalvelino, also spelled Casalvelino Marina, is a southern Italian village and hamlet (frazione) of Casal Velino, a municipality in the province of Salerno, Campania. With a population of 1,263 (2009), it is the most populated hamlet of its municipality.

History
The village, located next to the ruins of the Ancient Greek city of Velia, grew in population and urban expansion in the last decade of the 20th century, thanks to the tourism in the Cilentan Coast.

Geography
Marina di Casalvelino is a seaside village located by the Tyrrhenian Coast, in Cilento, and spans on a plain between the mouth of Alento river to the east, and the surrounding mountains to the west. It is 4 km from Casal Velino, Velia and Pioppi, 7 from Acquavella, 8 from Ascea and 20 from Vallo della Lucania.

Transport
The port of Marina is served by the hydrofoil's line MM6W Naples-Sorrento-Marina di Camerota, part of a local passenger ferry network named Metrò del Mare. The village is also crossed by the national highway SS 267.

Gallery

See also
Cilentan dialect
Cilento and Vallo di Diano National Park

References

External links

Frazioni of the Province of Salerno
Localities of Cilento